Nyugati pályaudvar (Western Railway Station) is a station on the M3 (North-South) line of the Budapest Metro. It is nominally located on the borders of District V, District VI and District XIII, the station itself is under Váci Road at between its intersections with Grand Boulevard and Katona József Street. The station was opened on 30 December 1981 as part of the extension of the line from Deák Ferenc tér to Lehel tér. Its name was Marx tér (Marx Square) before 1990.

The station is one of the busiest on the line, as it provides connections to tram lines 4 and 6 on Grand Boulevard, including access to Buda via Margit Bridge. Also, it serves the adjacent namesake Nyugati Railway Station (regional and international lines).

In popular culture 
The station makes an appearances in the 2021 Marvel Cinematic Universe film Black Widow.

Connections
Bus: 9, 26, 91, 191, 226, 291
Trolleybus: 72M, 73
Tram:  4, 6
Rail: Nyugati Railway Station

References

M3 (Budapest Metro) stations
Railway stations opened in 1981